Shamlu (also Romanized as Shāmlū and Shamloo; also known as Imicha and Omīdcheh) is a village in Bedevostan-e Gharbi Rural District, Khvajeh District, Heris County, East Azerbaijan Province, Iran. At the 2006 census, its population was 295, in 69 families.

References 

Populated places in Heris County